Quartz Peak is a summit in the U.S. state of Nevada.

Quartz Peak was named for deposits of quartz.

References

Mountains of Lincoln County, Nevada